The Amoranto Sports Complex is located in Quezon City, Philippines.

History
The Amoranto Sports Complex was inaugurated in 1966 by then President Ferdinand Marcos. The facility then consisted of a grandstand, an eight lane track and field oval, bleachers and a gymnasium.

The sports complex fell into disuse in the 2010s with its last competition being the 2013 POC-PSC Philippine National Games. Filipino national cyclists resided inside the complex until 2017 but seldom used the complex's dilapidated velodrome. There are plans to renovate the venue since 2016. The velodrome's specification has fallen behind international standards and it was proposed that a new velodrome be built.

In 2022, renovation plans for the sports complex was publicized. It includes the construction of the 3,500-seater Amoranto Arena, and a 10-lane Olympic-size swimming pool. It also includes the implementation of a tennis area for the Amoranto Indoor Sports Facility. In January 2023, the venue was declared fit to host international tournaments.

Facilities

The main stadium has a capacity of 15,000. The sports facility was named after former Quezon City Mayor Norberto Amoranto.

Several renovations have been done on the Amoranto Sports Complex since its opening. Currently, the sports facility features a tennis court, six badminton courts, a martial arts facility, a swimming pool, as well as a multipurpose gym, and a separate gym dedicated to boxing and weightlifting. The Amoranto Sports Complex also hosts a library for students.

The complex's velodrome hosted the cycling events for the 2005 Southeast Asian Games.

References

Velodromes in the Philippines
Sports venues in Quezon City
Venues of the 2005 Southeast Asian Games
Cycle racing in the Philippines
Athletics (track and field) venues in the Philippines
Buildings and structures in Quezon City
Sports venues completed in 1966
1966 establishments in the Philippines
Sports complexes in the Philippines